Aames is a surname. Notable people with the surname include:

Angela Aames (1956–1988), American actress
David Aames, the main protagonist character of the film Vanilla Sky
Willie Aames (born 1960), American actor, director, producer, and screenwriter

See also
 Aamer
 Ames (surname)
 Deir Aames, a municipality in Southern Lebanon
 Eames